11th ZAI Awards
Artmedia Music Academy Awards
Presenter(s)  

Broadcaster Markíza

Grand Prix Peter Lipa

◄ 10th │ 12th ►

The 11th ZAI Awards, honoring the best in the Slovak music industry for individual achievements for the year of 2000, took time and place on March 9, 2001 at the civic center Zrkadlový háj in Bratislava. The ceremony was held in association with the local Music Fund (HF) and the International Federation of the Phonographic Industry Slovakia (SNS IFPPI). As with the previous two editions, the accolades were named after the Artmedia Music Academy, established by ZAI and the related company in 1999.

Winners

Main categories

Genre awards

Others

References

External links
 ZAI Awards > Winners (Official site)
 Artmedia Awards > 2000 Winners (at SME)

11
Zai Awards
2000 music awards